Mikhail Mikalayevich Chigir (born 24 May 1948) is a Belarusian politician who served as the second Prime Minister of Belarus from 21 July 1994 to 18 November 1996.

Early life
Chigir was born in Usovo (Belarusian: Vusava) on 24 May 1948.

Career
Chigir was appointed as Prime Minister in July 1994, on the day following the inauguration of Alexander Lukashenko as president. Prior to this, he served as head of Belagroprombank, a bank specializing in agricultural pursuits.

Resignation
In 1996, Chigir resigned as prime minister in protest of Lukashenko's efforts to gain unlimited authority over the country. The following year he became a signatory of Charter 97. In 1999, he announced he would run for President of Belarus in order to unseat Lukashenko.

Arrest
On 30 March 1999, Chigir was arrested by the Belarusian government. It was alleged that he embezzled large sums of money involving loans while in charge of Belagroprombank. Chigir argued that the loans were not due to be repaid until after he was no longer with the bank, thus the money did not involve him. Prior to Chigir's arrest, several other officials who had been attempting to organize a campaign against Lukashenko were continuously repressed by the government, including Viktar Hanchar, who was arrested and later disappeared and eventually presumed murdered, allegedly under the order of someone close to the President. Chigir's arrest received negative reactions from governments around the world and his release was demanded by the US State Department, the European Union and the Organization for Security and Co-operation in Europe. Additionally, Amnesty International demanded his release and deemed him a prisoner of conscience. The International League for Human Rights also protested his arrest. Chigir ultimately avoided jail time, receiving a three-year suspended sentence with a two-year probationary period. Following the trial, he stated his intention to run for election to the House of Representatives of Belarus.

See also
Politics of Belarus

References

1948 births
Living people
People from Kapyl District
Prime Ministers of Belarus
Amnesty International prisoners of conscience held by Belarus
Belarusian prisoners and detainees
Financial University under the Government of the Russian Federation alumni
Belarus State Economic University alumni